Khil Raj Regmi (OGDB, OTSP, born 31 May 1949) was de facto Prime Minister of Nepal from 2013 to 2014. Regmi has served as Chief Justice of Nepal since May 2011, having been appointed by President Ram Baran Yadav after the expiry of the term of his predecessor, Chief Justice Ram Prasad Shrestha. In early 2013, the main political parties agreed to install Regmi as chairman of cabinet on a short-term basis, to oversee elections. He was sworn in on 14 March 2013 by President Yadav.

See also
Regmi interim cabinet, 2013

References

External links
 Profile at Supreme Court of Nepal's official website
 Khil Raj Regmi website

|-

1949 births
Living people
Nepalese Hindus
People from Palpa District
Government ministers of Nepal
Justices of the Supreme Court of Nepal
Prime ministers of Nepal
Tribhuvan University alumni
Chief justices of Nepal
Khas people
Nepal Law Campus alumni